Freddy Numberi  (born October 15, 1947) is a retired Vice Admiral in the Indonesian Navy and  politician from Yapen Waropen, Papua. He was part of the Second United Indonesia Cabinet and served as Minister of Transportation in Indonesia between October 22, 2009 and October 19, 2011. Under Susilo Bambang Yudhoyono, Freddy was chosen as the Ambassador of Indonesia to Italy, Albania and Malta and was then sworn in as Minister of Maritime Affairs and Fisheries (2004-2009). He was Governor of Papua from 1998 to 2000.

References

Indonesian admirals
1947 births
Living people
Governors of Papua (province)
Papuan people
Government ministers of Indonesia
Ambassadors of Indonesia to Italy
Ambassadors of Indonesia to Malta
Ambassadors of Indonesia to Albania
Indonesian Roman Catholics
Transport ministers of Indonesia